Gandanameno is a genus of African velvet spiders that was first described by Pekka T. Lehtinen in 1967.

Species
 it contains five species:
Gandanameno echinata (Purcell, 1908) – Namibia
Gandanameno fumosa (C. L. Koch, 1837) – South Africa
Gandanameno inornata (Pocock, 1898) – Malawi
Gandanameno purcelli (Tucker, 1920) – South Africa
Gandanameno spenceri (Pocock, 1900) (type) – South Africa

References

Araneomorphae genera
Eresidae
Spiders of Africa
Taxa named by Pekka T. Lehtinen